For many command line interpreters (“shell”) of Unix operating systems, the input field separators (IFS) variable is often [incorrectly] referred to as "internal" field separators. This "environment" variable holds one (or more) characters used to separate an input stream into tokens for program operations. When this variable holds more than one character, each character is treated equally to separate input into fields or values.

These whitespace characters can be visualized by issuing the "declare" command in the bash shell or printing  with commands like printf %s "$IFS" | od -c, printf "%q\n" "$IFS" or printf %s "$IFS" | cat -A (the latter two commands being only available in some shells and on some systems).

From the Bash4 man page:

Any character in  that is not  whitespace, along with any adjacent  whitespace characters, delimits a field. A sequence of  whitespace characters is also treated as a delimiter.

IFS abbreviation 
According to the Open Group Base Specifications, IFS is an abbreviation for "input field separators". A newer version of this specification mentions that "this name is misleading as the IFS characters are actually used as field terminators."

IFS is often [incorrectly] referred to as "internal field separators" on the internet.

Exploits 
IFS was usable as an exploit in some versions of Unix. This has been fixed by making the shells not inherit the IFS variable.

References

Unix